The Parquet national financier (PNF) is a French judicial institution proposed in late 2013 that is responsible for tracking down serious economic and financial crime. Since its installation on 1 March 2014, the financial public prosecutor deals with highly complex cases for which he has jurisdiction throughout France. Since 2019, it had been directed by Jean-François Bohnert.

Notable cases
 2022 – In November 2022, PNF opened a preliminary investigation into the organisation of the 2023 Rugby World Cup, which would look into whether there had been any corruption or favouritism regarding it.
 2017 – From 2017 to 2021, the PNF conducted a preliminary probe against former Prime Minister François Fillon for embezzlement and concealment, alleging he used public funds to pay an assistant who helped him write a book that was published in 2015.

References

External links
www.tribunal-de-paris.justice.fr

Judiciary of France